The Nikon D80 is a digital single-lens reflex camera model announced by Nikon on August 9, 2006. The camera shipped the first week of September to US retailers. Considered by many to be a hybrid of design elements of the entry-level D50 and high-end D200 cameras, it occupied the same price bracket the Nikon D70  did at the time of its release. It was replaced by the Nikon D90 in August 2008.

Features
 10.2 Megapixel CCD sensor
 Seven preset scene modes (Auto, Portrait, Landscape, Macro, Sports, Night Landscape and Night Portrait) selectable using a top-mounted dial
 User-selectable image optimization options (Normal, Softer, Vivid, More vivid, Portrait, Custom and Black-and-white)
 In-camera Retouch feature with D-Lighting, Red-eye correction, Trim, Image overlay, Monochrome and Filter effects
 In-camera Multiple exposure feature (merges up to three consecutive images)
 USB 2.0 Hi-speed interface
 Pentaprism viewfinder, rather than the more compact penta-mirror set up (0.94× magnification vs. 0.8× for the D40x). Same one on D200. 
 2.5 inch, 230,000 pixel LCD monitor (same as in D40, D40x and D200).

The Nikon D80 also inherits some of the D200's features such as the 10.2 MP image sensor, albeit with slower data throughput than the D200. The D80 is the second Nikon DSLR to use the SD card (the D50 being the first), rather than the CF card storage used in the D70, D70s and D200 and higher-end models. The higher storage capacity SDHC standard is also supported.

Optional accessories
 Wireless ML-L3 (IR) remote control and MC-DC1 remote cord
 Battery MB-D80 battery grip. Cheaper after-market clones exist.

Firmware
The last firmware set was released September 24 2008. v1.11 is the last version number for the A and B firmware. As of August 2018, it is available on the Nikon support site. The last firmware release coincides with the release of the D90, the replacement of the D80.

Images

See also
Nikon EXPEED
List of Nikon F-mount lenses with integrated autofocus motors

References

External links

 Nikon D80 – Nikon global website
 Nikon D80 – Nikon USA website
Digital Photography Review of the D80
Outdoor Photographer Nikon D80 Review
Reviews Index for Nikon D80

D80
D80
Cameras introduced in 2006
Cameras made in Thailand